The 1361 Shōhei earthquake was a major earthquake that occurred on August 3, 1361 (Gregorian calendar) in Japan. It is believed that this quake was one of the Nankaidō earthquakes. The magnitude was 8.4 Ms (Richter Scale Magnitude was 8.2 - 8.5) and it triggered a tsunami.

See also
List of earthquakes in Japan
Nankai Trough

References

External links 

 

14th-century earthquakes
1361
Earthquakes in Japan